The descendants of Alfonso XIII, Bourbon monarch of the Kingdom of Spain, are numerous. With his wife, Victoria Eugenie of Battenberg, he had a total of six legitimate children, with an additional child Ferdinand having been stillborn. Outside of his marriage, Alfonso was known to have had some issue, but they are not in the line of succession for any throne. The modern day king and royal family of Spain is descended from Alfonso, as is the legitimist claimant to France.

Legitimate issue by Victoria Eugenie of Battenberg

Alfonso, Prince of Asturias

Infante Jaime, Duke of Segovia

Infanta Beatriz of Spain

Infanta Maria Cristina of Spain

Infante Juan, Count of Barcelona

Infante Gonzalo of Spain

Illegitimate issue

Alfonso also had six known illegitimate children:

by French aristocrat Mélanie de Gaufridy de Dortan (1876–1937), married to Joseph-Marie-Philippe Lévêque de Vilmorin, he had:
  (12 September 1905 – 20 July 1980), who was recognized by Philippe de Vilmorin

by Pauline of Saint Glen, he had:
 Charles Maxime Victor of Saint Glen (3 July 1914 – 20 May 1934)

by Béatrice Noon, he had:
 Juana Alfonsa Milán y Quiñones de León (19 April 1916 – 16 May 2005)

by Spanish actress María del Carmen Ruiz y Moragas (1898 – 20 May 1936), he had:
 Ana María Teresa Ruiz y Moragas (9 October 1925 – 6 September 1965)
  (26 April 1929 – 18 June 2016), officially recognized by Spanish Courts on 21 May 2003 as Leandro Alfonso Luis de Borbón y Ruiz Moragas (or simply Leandro de Borbón)

by Marie Sousa, he had:
 Alonso of Borbon Sousa (28 December 1930 – 30 April 1934)

References

Lists of Spanish nobility
Spanish royalty
House of Bourbon (Spain)
Descendants of individuals